Werner Villinger (9 October 1887 in Besigheim – 8 August 1961 near Innsbruck) was a Nazi German psychiatrist, neurologist, eugenicist and the leading physician at the Bethel Institution ("Anstalt Bethel"). Villinger's specialities included juvenile delinquency, child guidance and group therapy. He was a Professor of Psychiatry at the Philipps University of Marburg and a leading member of the World Federation for Mental Health (WFMH).

Action T4
Under the Germany's Nazi regime of the 1930s and '40s, Villinger acted as an expert in the government's T-4 Euthanasia Program.

On Social Welfare Education Day 1934, Villinger gave a speech on sterilization and described the reaction, fears and resistance of the boys involved.

Post-war
Villinger attended the U.S. White House Conference on Children and Youth. In 1951, he became co-chairman of the WFMH Health and Human Relations Conference at Hiddesen-near-Detmold. In 1952, he was a member of a WFMH group on Educating the Public whose Annual Conference met in Brussels. In 1952, he was elected president of the German Association for Child and Youth Psychiatry, and in 1954 became the head of the medical department of Philipps University of Marburg.

In 1961, the German Federal Authorities announced their intent to try Villinger for his actions under the Nazi regime, but before he was brought to trial Villinger threw himself to his death off a mountain top near Innsbruck.

See also
Ernst Rüdin
Euthanasia
List of Nazi doctors
Nazi eugenics

References
The Origins of Nazi Genocide 
In the Name of the People
Medical and Psychological Effects of Concentration Camps on Holocaust Survivors

1887 births
1961 suicides
People from Besigheim
People from the Kingdom of Württemberg
Physicians in the Nazi Party
German psychiatrists
German eugenicists
German neurologists
Aktion T4 personnel
Historians of Nazism
Commanders Crosses of the Order of Merit of the Federal Republic of Germany
Nazis who committed suicide in Austria
Suicides by jumping in Austria